This is a list of bridges and tunnels longer than 100 feet (30 m) on U.S. Route 101 in Oregon, also known as the Oregon Coast Highway, from south to north. Many of them were designed by Conde McCullough.

See also
Lists of Oregon-related topics

References

Oregon Department of Transportation, Spanning Oregon's Coast, accessed April 2008

 U.S. Route A101
Bridges
Bridges, Route 101
Bridges in Oregon
Oregon
Bridges, Route 101